The Lansing Metal Center was a General Motors foundry located in Lansing Township, Michigan directly across Saginaw Street from the Lansing Craft Center. It was originally built as a jet engine manufacturing plant in 1952 and shuttered in 2006.

General Motors began the demolition of the plant in February 2008 along with the Lansing Craft Center, when all operations were transferred to the nearby Lansing Delta Township facility.

References 

General Motors factories
Former motor vehicle assembly plants
Economy of Lansing, Michigan
Motor vehicle assembly plants in Michigan
1952 establishments in Michigan